List of champions of the 1907 U.S. National Championships tennis tournament (now known as the US Open). The men's tournament was held from 20 August to 28 August on the outdoor grass courts at the Newport Casino in Newport, Rhode Island. The women's tournament was held from 25 June to 2 July on the outdoor grass courts at the Philadelphia Cricket Club in Philadelphia, Pennsylvania. It was the 27th U.S. National Championships and the third Grand Slam tournament of the three played that year.

Finals

Men's singles

 William Larned defeated  Robert LeRoy  6–2, 6–2, 6–4

Women's singles

 Evelyn Sears defeated  Carrie Neely  6–3, 6-2

Men's doubles
 Fred Alexander (USA) /  Harold Hackett (USA) defeated  Nat Thornton (USA) /  Bryan M. Grant (USA) 6–2, 6–1, 6–1

Women's doubles
 Marie Wimer (USA) /   Carrie Neely  (USA) defeated  Edna Wildey (USA) /  Natalie Wildey (USA) 6–1, 2–6, 6–4

Mixed doubles
 May Sayers (USA) /  Wallace F. Johnson (USA) defeated  Natalie Widley (USA) /  Herbert M. Tilden (USA) 6–1, 7–5

References

External links
Official US Open website

 
U.S. National Championships
U.S. National Championships (tennis) by year
U.S. National Championships
U.S. National Championships (tennis)
U.S. National Championships (tennis)
U.S. National Championships (tennis)
U.S. National Championships (tennis)